Sivers may refer to:

People
 Fanny de Sivers (1920 – 2011), Estonian linguist
 Malou von Sivers (b. 1953), Swedish journalist
 Marie Steiner-von Sivers (1867 – 1948), Polish Anthroposophist
 Rudolf Sivers (1892 – 1918), Russian revolutionary

Places
 Lake Sivers, a lake in Latvia

See also 
 Sievers